Pacífico railway station, is a railway station, managed by Incofer, located in Hospital district, San José canton in Costa Rica. It holds the main office of the Incofer railway operator. 

The main building was built in 1941 with functionalism architecture design, there is a wide lobby in the entrance with prominent staircases at both sides. It is an Historic Interest building since 26 November 1997.

See also 
 Rail transport in Costa Rica
 Interurbano Line

External links
 Estación del Pacífico Virtual Tour, as of mid 2019

References

Rail transport in Costa Rica